Hurricane Barbara was the second named tropical cyclone of the 1953 Atlantic hurricane season. Forming from a tropical wave on August 11 in the southern Bahamas, Barbara moved northward and attained hurricane status the next day. Ultimately peaking with winds corresponding to Category 1 status on the modern-day Saffir–Simpson hurricane scale, Barbara moved ashore in eastern North Carolina and curved back out to sea. The storm passed to the southeast of the New England region and dissipated on August 16. Damage from the hurricane was fairly minor, totaling around $1.3 million (1953 USD, $  USD). Most of it occurred in North Carolina and Virginia from crop damage. The hurricane left several injuries, some traffic accidents, as well as seven fatalities in the eastern United States; at least two were due to electrocution from downed power lines. Offshore Atlantic Canada, a small boat sunk, killing its crew of two.

Meteorological history

In the days preceding the storm's formation, a tropical wave moved westward across the Atlantic Ocean. The wave was initially weak as it tracked toward Cuba, but on August 10, there were indications of a closed circulation center over the eastern portion of the island. The low deepened a bit as it moved northward to a position near Eleuthera Island in the Bahamas on August 11, at which time the disturbance organized into a tropical storm. It is estimated that Barbara became a hurricane at around 1200 UTC.

Moving north-northwestward, the hurricane continued to mature, and it attained an intensity corresponding to a strong Category 1 hurricane on the modern-day Saffir–Simpson hurricane scale early on August 13 as it approached eastern North Carolina. Shortly thereafter, Barbara reached its peak winds of  while located south of Cape Hatteras. The cyclone moved over the Outer Banks of North Carolina overnight, crossing the shore between Morehead City and Ocracoke. It weakened as it progressed northward, and curved eastward out to sea due to a building ridge. It passed just southeast of the Mid-Atlantic states and New England, brushing Cape Cod, Massachusetts as it began to accelerate northeastward.

As Barbara moved toward the Canadian Maritimes, it began to undergo an extratropical transition, completing the transition by late on August 15 just south of Nova Scotia. However, the Canadian Hurricane Centre assessed Barbara as remaining tropical until after it turned northward and struck eastern Nova Scotia on August 16. At this time, a trough developed to the southeast of the storm, and Barbara later tracked just west of Newfoundland. A new low formed in association with the trough, and as Barbara rapidly headed northward, the developing center moved more slowly. However, the new low quickly gained strength and became the more intense of the two storm systems. Barbara then stalled near Goose Bay and lost its tropical identity, dissipating late on August 16.

Preparations and impact

Before the hurricane began affecting land, the U.S. Weather Bureau issued northeast storm warnings from Myrtle Beach, South Carolina to Cape Hatteras, North Carolina. The agency also advised small boats in the region to remain at port during the storm. Evacuations were ordered for a few islands in the Outer Banks, and several thousand tourists voluntarily left the coastline for safer areas. Overall, about 50,000 people evacuated due to the hurricane. Further north, the Coast Guard advised people to avoid swimming along the coast of Long Island.

The lowest pressure on land related to the storm was 988 hPa (29.19 inHg) at Coinjock, North Carolina. Torrential rainfall, unofficially exceeding  at Nags Head, fell across the state and extending northward into Virginia. The maximum rainfall associated with Barbara was  near Onley along the Eastern Shore of Virginia. Offshore, a freighter rode out the storm after losing power.

Along the coastline, Barbara flooded roads and houses. Strong winds downed trees and power lines, leaving some cities isolated from communication. Some of the downed trees were large and had survived the Great Atlantic Hurricane of 1944. The combination of winds and rainfall left some damage to crops and structures. The storm's impact along the coast was light to moderate, with monetary damage estimated around $1.3 million (1953 USD, $  USD), mostly from the crop damage. Four marines in the Marine Corps Air Station Cherry Point were injured, as was a Coast Guard worker. One person died at Wrightsville Beach, North Carolina, after winds blew him off of a pier. A report on the cyclone by the U.S. Weather Bureau indicates that this is the only causality associated with Barbara. However, newspaper articles subsequent to the storm report several more fatalities, with one paper reporting a total of seven deaths; two of them were from electrocutions. The rainfall from Barbara was blamed for traffic accidents further north in New Jersey and New York City, causing four deaths. There was also an indirect death in New York when a man had a heart attack while securing his boat. In Atlantic City, New Jersey, there was damage to storefronts. Along Nantucket, the hurricane washed several boats ashore, although there was little damage in the region.

In the Grand Banks offshore Atlantic Canada, Barbara sunk a dory, killing two people. Along the Canadian mainland, ships were advised to stay at port during the storm. Barbara produced tropical storm force winds across the region, peaking at  when it moved ashore.

See also

List of North Carolina hurricanes
List of New England hurricanes
Other storms of the same name

References

External links
 Monthly Weather Review

Category 1 Atlantic hurricanes
Hurricanes in North Carolina
1953 Atlantic hurricane season